Barker Bill's Trick Shooting is a light gun shooter video game developed and published by Nintendo for the Nintendo Entertainment System in 1990.

Gameplay

Barker Bill's Trick Shooting consists of four carnival-type game modes in which the player uses a NES Zapper to shoot various objects for points. Higher scores are given for more daring shots: those on the verge of disappearing or breaking award the most points. The game modes consist of:
Balloon Saloon
The player attempts to shoot balloons flying away while avoiding hitting the dog from Duck Hunt. Ballons are worth 100 points each.
Flying Saucers
Barker Bill and his assistant Trixie will toss plates across the screen. Shoot the plates while avoiding Bill, Trixie, and the parrot. Plates are scored according to how close they are to the floor: from 100 very high up to 500 just above the floor.
Window Pains
Assorted objects will fall down a screen full of windows, but some of the windows are closed, blocking the player's shots. He can only hit objects through open windows. Hits are scored according to the row the object is hit: from 100 at the top row to 500 on the bottom.
Fun Follies
This involves progressing through the previous three in turn followed by two additional stages:
 Trixie's Shot (first seen in stage 4)
Trixie walks around the screen and occasionally presents coins. Shoot the coins while trying not to hit her or the parrot. Points range from 100 to 500 points depending on how quickly they're shot after being presented; any coin she tosses away is always worth 500 points.
After playing Trixie's Shot, provided at least one diamond was earned, the player will go to a slot machine; pull the trigger to stop the slots. This is the only way to win extra chances in Fun Follies. Diamonds that the player collected in earlier stages (which do not give him extra chances in Fun Follies) allow for more winning lines and a better chance at a big prize. The player is awarded for all winning lines, allowing the potential (with at least two diamonds) for up to 15 extra chances.
 Bill's Thrills (first seen in stage 9)
Bill will throw objects like eggs and tomatoes high up. Hit them before they reach Trixie, but be careful of the parrot again. Scoring is higher due to the difficulty and depends on the size of the object thrown: from 800 for the relatively large tomato to 1,500 for the tiny egg.

The player will start each game with ten chances. Except during Fun Follies, they can gain a life by shooting a diamond. The player lose one chance for committing each of the following:
Failing to hit a target.
Hitting the wrong thing (such as a person or animal).
The game is over when the player runs out of chances.

Music

The soundtrack was composed by Hirokazu Tanaka, who had worked on the music for earlier Nintendo games such as Balloon Fight and Duck Hunt. The high scores music from the VS versions of these games was later remixed by Tanaka in Trick Shooting. The only difference is that the song is now in the key of C# rather than C. The game uses Tanaka's later sound engine, with digitized drum samples.

Reception

Allgame gave the game a score of 3.5 stars out of 5. Game Freaks 365 gave it a rating of 83% (the equivalent of a B grade) in their 2005 review.

See also
List of Famicom games
List of NES games

References

External links

Barker Bill's Trick Shooting at NinDB

1990 video games
Light gun games
Nintendo Entertainment System games
Nintendo Entertainment System-only games
Nintendo games
Nintendo Research & Development 1 games
Video games based on television series
Video games developed in Japan
Video games scored by Hirokazu Tanaka